Veena Talwar Oldenburg is Professor of History at Baruch College and The Graduate Center of the City University of New York. She is best known for her widely reviewed book on Dowry murder.

Oldenburg is a native of Lucknow, India.  She has a bachelor's degree from Loreto Convent College and an M.A. from the University of Lucknow.  She has a second master's from the University of Bridgeport which she earned shortly after immigrating to the United States in 1970 and a Ph.D. from the University of Illinois at Urbana-Champaign.

Oldenburg has previously taught at Sarah Lawrence College and Columbia University. She is a 2016 Fulbright Nehru Senior Scholar.

Works

She has authored a number of books on Indian history:
 The Making of Colonial Lucknow, 1856-1877 Princeton, N.J. : Princeton University Press, ©1984.
 Dowry murder : the imperial origins of a cultural crime : Oxford ; New York : Oxford University Press, 2002.
 Review, The American historical review. 112, no. 2, (2007): 484
 Review, International Journal of Hindu Studies, 10, no. 1 (2006): 117-118
 Review, Estudios de Asia y Africa. 40, no. 3, (2005): 709
 Review, The Indian economic and social history review. 41, no. 4, (2004): 516
 Lifestyle as resistance: the case of the courtesans of Lucknow. \

Sources

University of Lucknow alumni
Indian emigrants to the United States
University of Bridgeport alumni
University of Illinois Urbana-Champaign alumni
Sarah Lawrence College faculty
Columbia University faculty
City University of New York faculty
American Hindus
Living people
American women historians
Year of birth missing (living people)
21st-century American women